Shepway may refer to the following places and institutions in Kent, England:

 Shepway, Maidstone, a suburb of Maidstone
 The former name for Folkestone and Hythe District
 The name of a lathe, a historical subdivision of Kent
 The court of Shepway, a historical local royal court of justice associated with the Cinque Ports

See also
 Isle of Sheppey